Lepidodorsum is a genus of bird mites in the family Macronyssidae. There is at least one described species in Lepidodorsum, L. tiptoni.

References

Acari genera
Mesostigmata
Articles created by Qbugbot